Tepovirus is a genus of viruses in the order Tymovirales, in the family Betaflexiviridae. Plants as well as some other root and  tuber crops in the andes serve as natural hosts. There are two species in this genus.

Taxonomy
The following species are assigned to the genus:
Potato virus T
Prunus virus 1

Structure
Viruses in Tepovirus are non-enveloped, with flexuous and filamentous geometries. The diameter is around 12 nm. Genomes are linear, around 6.5kb in length. The genome codes for 3 proteins.

Life cycle
Viral replication is cytoplasmic. Entry into the host cell is achieved by penetration into the host cell. Replication follows the positive stranded RNA virus replication model. Positive stranded RNA virus transcription is the method of transcription. Plants as well as some other root and tuber crops in the Andes serve as the natural host. Transmission routes are seed borne and pollen associated.

References

External links
 Viralzone: Tepovirus
 ICTV
ICTVdB - The Universal Virus Database: Potato virus T
Family Groups - The Baltimore Method

Betaflexiviridae
Virus genera
Viral plant pathogens and diseases